Yim Tin Tsai is the name of two islands in Hong Kong:
 Yim Tin Tsai (Tai Po District), Hong Kong
 Yim Tin Tsai (Sai Kung District), Hong Kong